Great Lakes Secondary School (GLSS) is a high school in Sarnia, Ontario.  It was previously named St. Clair Secondary School, and it was renamed after being consolidated with Sarnia Collegiate Institute and Technical School.  It is managed by the Lambton Kent District School Board.  

Team name: Wolfpack
School colours: light blue, silver and black
Grades: 9–12

Sports 

Great Lakes Secondary School has teams that are competitive at the board, regional, provincial, and national level.  Teams include:(1)

 Badminton
 Baseball
 Basketball (Girls AA OFSAA Silver 2009,2010)
 Cross Country Running
 Football(2015 OFSAA 8-man Champs) 
 Golf
 Hockey
 Reach For The Top (Trivia)
 Rugby (Girls AA OFSAA Bronze 2010)
 Soccer
 Swimming
 Tennis
 Track and Field
 Volleyball 
 Wrestling

Music 

GLSS has strong instrumental and vocal music programs.  The bands (Grade 9, Junior, Senior, and Jazz) compete at local and out of town music festivals.  Most years the school also puts on a dramatic musical production.

The school has a group of singers in its very own vocals class. The singers of the class often put on shows for the community to come watch usually for a small price.

Notable graduates 

 Kim Mitchell, Canadian rock artist **
 Mike Weir, professional golfer **
 Nail Yakupov, professional hockey player **
**graduated when school's name was St. Clair Secondary School

References

External links
 Great Lakes Secondary School
 Lambton Kent District School Board

High schools in Sarnia
Educational institutions in Canada with year of establishment missing